The Inn on the Lahn or The Hostess of the Lahn  (German: Die Wirtin an der Lahn) is a 1955 West German comedy film directed by Johann Alexander Hübler-Kahla and starring Dorit Kreysler, Oskar Sima and Ingrid Pan.  The film's sets were designed by the art directors Ernst H. Albrecht and Paul Markwitz .

Synopsis
Karoline Steinmeier and her husband Josef are a tight-fisted couple who run an inn on the River Lahn near the Rhineland. For years they have been collecting the pension of her grandfather who had long since died, from his employer a winemaker. When he wants to visit to celebrate the old man's hundred birthday, the couple urgently have to find a replacement grandfather in order to prevent the fraud being discovered.

Cast
 Dorit Kreysler as Karoline Steinmeier
 Oskar Sima as  Josef Steinmeier, ihr Gatte
 Hanita Hallan as Gretl, beider Nichte
 Josef Egger as  Großvater Zimperl
 Ingrid Pan as  Marie Zimperl, seine Enkelin
 Werner Fuetterer as Herr Sonnenschein, Handlungsreisender
 Joachim Brennecke as  Direktor Hans Eschelbach
 Katharina Mayberg as  Josefine, Kellnerin
 Irina Garden as Claire
 Ludwig Schmidseder as Gendarm

References

Bibliography
 Goble, Alan. The Complete Index to Literary Sources in Film. Walter de Gruyter, 1999.
 Klossner, Michael. The Europe of 1500-1815 on Film and Television: A Worldwide Filmography of Over 2550 Works, 1895 Through 2000. McFarland & Company, 2002.

External links 
 

1955 films
1955 comedy films
German comedy films
West German films
1950s German-language films
Films directed by Johann Alexander Hübler-Kahla
1950s German films

de:Die Wirtin an der Lahn